The Lionel Hampton School of Music is the music school at the University of Idaho in Moscow, Idaho. The school is named after jazz vibraphonist Lionel Hampton.

Naming
In 1984, Lionel Hampton performed at the University of Idaho's Jazz Festival, which bills itself as America's largest education-based jazz festival. Hampton was impressed with what he saw and was pleased to see the emphasis on education. He pledged his support to the University of Idaho's jazz festival and to help support jazz education. The festival was renamed the Lionel Hampton Jazz Festival in 1985.

Two years later, in 1987, the university's music school was also named after Hampton. Hampton considered it one of the greatest honors ever to be bestowed upon him. To this day, the Lionel Hampton School of Music remains the only school of music in the United States to be named after a jazz musician.

About the school
The Lionel Hampton School of Music is accredited by the National Association of Schools of Music. It was founded as a department in 1893, just four years after the University of Idaho came into existence. It was elevated to school status in 1969. The school's mission statement is to "serve as a professional school of choice in Idaho for undergraduate and graduate music programs and as an academic department within the College of Letters and Science offering liberal studies in music...". The Lionel Hampton School of Music is part of the College of Letters, Arts, and Social Sciences. The current Director of the school is Dr. Vanessa Sielert The Associate Director is Dr. Leonard Garrison.

Degree programs

Undergraduate level
The Lionel Hampton School of Music offers the following undergraduate degrees. Each of these are available with an optional jazz emphasis.

Bachelor of Music in:
Performance
Composition
Music education
Business

Bachelor of Arts or Bachelor of Science in:
Music theory
Music history and literature
Applied music

Academic minor in music

Graduate level
The School of Music offers the following graduate degrees:

Master of Music in:
Vocal performance
Instrumental performance
Piano pedagogy and performance studies
Music education
Accompanying
Composition

Master of Arts in music history

Ensembles
The Lionel Hampton School of Music offers many ensembles for students to participate in. Students are also encouraged to form their own ensembles.

Audition-only ensembles:
Vandaleers (concert choir)
Jazz choir
Wind ensemble
Jazz band
Opera/musical theater studio

Ensembles open to all students at the University of Idaho:
Vandal marching band
Concert band
University Chorus
Jazz choir

Chamber ensembles include:
Bassoon
Flute
Trumpet
Trombone
Horn
Tuba/euphonium
percussion
Saxophone

Notable alumni
Daniel Bukvich (M.M.), current faculty member

Notable faculty
Daniel Bukvich, professor of percussion and music theory

Facilities
The Music Building is home to most faculty offices. It also holds all of the school's classrooms, including the lecture hall. There is also a recital hall, a rehearsal room, and storage facilities for most of the students' instruments.

Ridenbaugh Hall, a former women's dormitory and the oldest building on campus, contains two faculty offices, several graduate student offices, and practice rooms. The building is also used by the university's art department as a gallery.

Blake House, a former fraternity house and women's co-op. It contains more faculty offices, and a marching band storage area.

References

University of Idaho
1893 establishments in Idaho